Əmirvarlı (also, Amirvarly and Emirvarly) is a village in the Jabrayil Rayon of Azerbaijan. It was occupied by the Armenian forces in 1993. The Army of Azerbaijan recaptured the village on or around 19 October 2020.

References 

 

Populated places in Jabrayil District